Eumitra caledonica is a species of sea snail, a marine gastropod mollusk, in the family Mitridae, the miters or miter snails.

Distribution
This marine species occurs off New Caledonia.

References

caledonica
Gastropods described in 1991